Rafnia is a genus of flowering plants in the family Fabaceae. It belongs to the subfamily Faboideae.

Species
Rafnia comprises the following species:
 Rafnia acuminata (E. Mey.) G. J. Campbell & B.-E. van Wyk
 Rafnia affinis Harv.
 Rafnia amplexicaulis Thunb.
 Rafnia angulata Thunb.

 Rafnia capensis (L.) Druce
 subsp. calycina G. J. Campbell & B.-E. van Wyk
 subsp. capensis (L.) Druce
 subsp. carinata G. J. Campbell & B.-E. van Wyk
 subsp. dichotoma (Eckl. & Zeyh.) G. J. Campbell & B.-E. van Wyk
 subsp. elsieae G. J. Campbell & B.-E. van Wyk
 subsp. ovata (P. J. Bergius) G. J. Campbell & B.-E. van Wyk
 subsp. pedicellata G. J. Campbell & B.-E. van Wyk
 Rafnia crassifolia Harv.
 Rafnia crispa C.H. Stirt.

 Rafnia diffusa Thunb.
 Rafnia divaricata Eckl. & Zeyh.
 Rafnia elliptica Thunb.
 Rafnia ericifolia T.M. Salter
 Rafnia fastigiata Eckl. & Zeyh.
 Rafnia globosa G. J. Campbell & B.-E. van Wyk
 Rafnia humilis Eckl. & Zeyh.
 Rafnia lancea DC.

 Rafnia racemosa Eckl. & Zeyh.
 Rafnia retroflexa Thunb.

 Rafnia spicata Thunb.
 Rafnia thunbergii Harv.
 Rafnia triflora Thunb.
 Rafnia virens E. Mey.

References

Crotalarieae
Fabaceae genera